She Would Never Know is a South Korean television series starring Won Jin-ah, Rowoon, Lee Hyun-wook, Lee Joo-bin, and Lee Kyu-han. Based on the 2017 web novel Senior, Don't Put on That Lipstick by Elise (Elize), it premiered on JTBC on January 18, 2021.

Synopsis
The series tells the story of people working on the marketing team of a cosmetics brand, with a focus on the senior/junior relationship of Yoon Song-ah (Won Jin ah) and Chae Hyun-seung (Rowoon).  Substories include Chae Hyun-seung's sister, Chae Ji-Seung a dress maker, dating Lee Jae-Woon, a BM at the cosmetics company and his other sister, Chae Yeon-Seung, relationship with her closeted husband, Kang Woo-Hyun and their young daughter, Kang Ha-Eun.

Cast

Main
 Won Jin-ah as Yoon Song-ah
 a senior at KLAR cosmetics 2 years elder in work experience and 1 year elder in age from Hyun seung. She was in a relationship with BM Lee Jae-shin for 2 years.
 Rowoon as Chae Hyun-seung
 an intern who started to like Song-ah on their first encounter itself. He was the first one to know about Song-ah and BM Lee's relationship.
 Lee Hyun-wook as Lee Jae-shin
 BM secretly dating Song-ah for 2 years but engaged to Lee Hyo-joo.
 Lee Joo-bin as Lee Hyo-joo
 BMs Lee Jae-Woon's sister; grand-daughter to the owner of the cosmetic company; engaged to BM Lee Jae-shin.
 Lee Kyu-han as Lee Jae-woon
 a BM at the cosmetic company, grandson to the owner of the cosmetic company; starts dating Chae Hyun-seung's sister Chae Ji-Seung.
Wang Bit-na as Chae Ji-seung
 Chae Hyun-seung's sister; a high-end wedding dress maker; starts dating BM Lee Jae-woon

Supporting
 Park Han-sol as Lee Se-rim
 Park So-yi as Kang Ha-eun
 Choi Jung-won as Ryu Han-seo
 Lee Dong-ha as Kang Woo-hyun
 Ha Yoon-kyung as Chae Yeon-seung
 Lee Ji-hyun as Oh Wol-son
 Kang Hye-jin as Kim Ga-young
 Ahn Se-ha as Kwon Sung-yeon
 Yang Jo-ah as Yoo Jae-gyum
 Kim Han-na as Ahn Yoo-sun
 Kim Hye-in as Kang Soo-mi
 Kwon Han-sol as Do Ye-jin
 Kim Kwang-kyu as Kim Joong-hyuk
 Kim Min-gwi as Model
 Jeon Gook-han as Chairman Lee

Original soundtrack
Part 1

Part 2

Part 3

Part 4

Part 5

Part 6

Part 7

Ratings

International broadcast
The series is available for worldwide streaming exclusively on iQIYI at the same time as the episodes air on JTBC in South Korea, with subtitles in Chinese, English, Thai, Bahasa Malaysia, Vietnamese, Indonesian, Spanish and Arabic.

References

External links
  
 
 
 

JTBC television dramas
Korean-language television shows
2021 South Korean television series debuts
South Korean romance television series
South Korean workplace television series
Fashion-themed television series
Television shows based on South Korean novels